Lara Marie Moscardon Maigue (born June 7, 1991) is a Filipina singer and songwriter who won the 2017 Aliw Awards for Best Classical Performer and the 2018 Aliw Awards for Best Female Crossover Performer.

Early life 
Lara was born to Filipino composer and arranger, Professor Rayben Maigue, and soprano, Nanette Moscardon, who also became her first classical mentor. She was later trained by Fides Cuyugan-Asensio at the University of the Philippines College of Music, where she graduated majoring in Voice.

Career 
A classically-trained soprano, Lara's musical repertoire also consists of singing opera, Kundiman, jazz standards, broadway, OPM, as well as her own original compositions.

Since 2010, Lara has promoted Filipino music in different parts of the world with solo cultural concerts in Florence, Italy; Canberra and Sydney, Australia; Singapore and New Delhi, India.

Her foray into song writing came in 2013, where she became one of the top five finalists in the song writing competition headed by Ryan Cayabyab and Manny V. Pangilinan, the Philippine Popular Music Festival (Philpop) for her composition, “Sa’yo Na Lang Ako,” interpreted by singer/actress Karylle. She later on tried her hand at acting and became one of the lead stars in the musical teleserye on TV5, “Trenderas", where she was nominated for “Outstanding Breakthrough Performance by an Actress” by the Golden Screen TV Awards.

In 2015, Lara became one of the top 12 finalists in Philpop, with her entry, “Nasaan.” Prior to her becoming a finalist, Lara also wrote teleserye and movie theme songs interpreted by some of the Philippines’ known recording artists—including Erik Santos, Jaya, and Regine Velasquez-Alcasid.

In 2017, Lara won the Aliw Award for Best Classical Performer. The same year, she portrayed the role of 'Ligaya Paraiso' in the award-winning movie turned into a musical "Maynila Sa Mga Kuko ng Liwanag" directed by Joel Lamangan.

In 2018, Lara went back to television, this time as segment host of Sagisag Kultura TV, a program by the National Commission for Culture and the Arts on PTV-4.  She also reprised her role as Monica in Giancarlo Menotti's opera, “The Medium.”  
 
While Lara continued to grace many a-corporate and private events, she continued to perform alongside veteran concert performers.  Gary Valenciano's Awit at Laro  was a project where she had double participation in – as composer of Piko, interpreted by Morissette Amon, and Interpreter of Patintero, a composition of National Artist for Music Ryan Cayabyab and Jose Javier Reyes, along with the AMP Big Band. She also played the role of interpreter to fresh compositions like the theme song of Cinemalaya entry “Kung Paano Hinihintay Ang Dapithapon.” 

In between all these performances, Lara was selected to participate in the master class of noted opera singer, Sumi Jo during the Hong Kong International Operatic Singing Competition 2018. She also emerged as Finalist at the Singapore Lyric Opera Asean Vocal Competition. 
 
Toward the end of the year, Lara signed up under Star Music and launched her very first single, her originally written piece, Kung Puwede Lang Naman.  Under Star Music, she will release more of her original compositions as well as some covers.
 
Before the close of 2018, the Aliw Awards Foundation nominated her for two categories, Best Female Classical Performer and Best Female Crossover Performer.  Lara Maigue was declared Best Female Crossover Performer for 2018.

Lara is signed with Alcasid Total Entertainment Artist Management (ATeam), where she has performed as special guest in the concerts of Ogie Alcasid, Gary Valenciano and most recently Regine Velasquez-Alcasid, as an opening act in Velasquez’ 30th anniversary concert, R3.0.

Lara is currently training under Filipino-American tenor, Arthur Espiritu. She divides her time as an artist and as managing partner and vocal coach in her family's music school, the Maigue Music Studio (MMS).

In 2021, Lara signed up with Star Magic as part of their Black Pen Day event, as part of the ATeam's partnership with Star Magic. In August 2021, she began temporarily filling in as part of the New Gen Birit Divas, until Zephanie Dimaranan transferred to GMA Network in 2022, when Fana was named as her permanent replacement.

References

External links
 
 
 

Living people
1991 births
Filipino singer-songwriters
21st-century Filipino actresses
Singers from Manila
21st-century Filipino women singers
Actresses from Manila
Filipino stage actresses